Di Asa is a reality show that is telecast on Atinka TV. The reality show engage plus sized woman who are market women from the sixteen regions of Ghana to compete together by showing their dancing skills and the winners would be rewarded at the end of the show or program.

Winners

References

Ghanaian television shows